Robert Murphy Sr. (born September 19, 1973) is an American basketball executive, former coach and player. He is currently the Assistant General Manager of the Detroit Pistons of the National Basketball Association (NBA) and President of the Motor City Cruise of the NBA G League, the affiliate of the Pistons. He previously served as the head men's basketball coach for the Eastern Michigan Eagles from 2011 to 2021. Murphy, an inductee of the Central State University Alumni Achievement Hall of Fame, March 1, 2022 and also an inductee of the Mumford High School Hall of Fame, October 1, 2019.

College
Rob Murphy attended and played for Central State University basketball program in Wilberforce, Ohio from 1992–1996. Murphy was a two-time team captain during his junior and senior campaigns. Murphy was also named the Marauders' Defensive Player of the Year as a senior while playing for former NBA point guard, Kevin Porter. Murphy was inducted into the CSU Hall of Fame March 1, 2022.

High school coaching career
After graduating from Central State, Murphy was hired as an associate head coach at Central High School in Detroit from 1996–1998. After the team reached the state finals in his first year, Detroit Central won a Class A state title in 1998.

Murphy was then hired as head coach at Crockett Technical High School in Detroit. Among his players was Maurice Ager, who was the first-round draft choice of the Dallas Mavericks. Murphy had an overall record of 64–20 at Crockett Technical and was named Detroit Free Press All-Metro Coach of the Year after his club won the Class B state championship in 2001.

College coaching career
Murphy joined Kent State in 2002 as an assistant coach. The Golden Flashes were 21–10 overall and 12–6 in the Mid-American Conference in 2002–03. Kent State reached the final of the MAC Tournament Championship and earned an invitation to the National Invitation Tournament. Murphy was instrumental in the recruitment of Antonio Gates to Kent State in which Gates led the Flashes to the Elite 8. Murphy coached Antonio Gates at Detroit Central HS and Kent State.

Following the 2004 season, when Syracuse Orange assistant coach Troy Weaver left for a coaching position with the Utah Jazz, Murphy was hired by the Orange. Murphy was known for developing versatile forward position players with the Orange. Some of the players he tutored include Hakim Warrick, Terrence Roberts, Donte Greene, Wesley Johnson, Kris Joseph, Fab Melo, Arinze Onuaku, CJ Fair, Dion Waiters, Michael Carter-Williams, Rakeem Christmas and James Southerland.

Eastern Michigan
In his debut season (2011) with Eastern Michigan, Rob Murphy guided the Eagles to a first ever MAC-West championship along with being named 2012 MAC coach of the year. During the 2013–14 season, Murphy guided Eastern to its first 20-win season since 1997–98 (18 years), while also sending the Eagles to their first postseason tournament (the CollegeInsider.com Tournament) since '97–98. Rob Murphy was named a Ben Jobe Award Finalist for the 2013/14 season. Murphy guided his EMU Eagles to a win over Big 10 foe Michigan on December 9, 2014, and holds a victory over Purdue the previous season.

Motor City Cruise
On March 17, 2021, the Motor City Cruise announced the hiring of Murphy as president and general manager.

Detroit Pistons
On September 1, 2021, the Detroit Pistons announced the promotion of Murphy becoming the Sr Director of Player Personnel for the Detroit Pistons. Murphy's job duties include overseeing all pro, college and high school scouting department while preparing for the NBA Draft, Trades and Free Agency.

On June 1st, 2022, the Pistons announced the promotion of Murphy becoming Assistant General Manager of the Detroit Pistons.  Murphy's job duties include overseeing all pro, college and high school scouting department while preparing for the NBA Draft, Trades and Free Agency.

Head coaching record

College

References

External links

Eastern Michigan profile
 Statistics at College Basketball-Reference.com

1973 births
Living people
American men's basketball coaches
American men's basketball players
Basketball coaches from Michigan
Basketball players from Detroit
Central State Marauders basketball players
College men's basketball head coaches in the United States
Eastern Michigan Eagles men's basketball coaches
High school basketball coaches in Michigan
Kent State Golden Flashes men's basketball coaches
Syracuse Orange men's basketball coaches